The Texas Fireball was a spectacular meteorite which occurred on November 8, 2014.

References

See also

Meteorites by name